Raker is a surname. Notable people with the surname include:

Irma S. Raker (born 1938), American lawyer
John E. Raker (1863–1926), American lawyer and politician

See also
Baker (surname)
Maker (surname)
Racker
Rakers